Hyposmocoma ekaha is a species of moth of the family Cosmopterigidae. It was first described by Otto Herman Swezey in 1910. It is endemic to the Hawaiian island of Oahu. The type locality is the Halawa Valley.

The larvae feed on Asplenium nidus.

External links

ekaha
Endemic moths of Hawaii
Moths described in 1910